The Minister for Nordic Cooperation is one of the Finnish Government's ministerial positions. The minister is one of the three leading positions at the Ministry for Foreign Affairs.

Finland's incumbent Minister for Nordic Cooperation is Thomas Blomqvist of the Swedish People's Party.

See also 
 Minister for Nordic Cooperation (Denmark)
 Minister for Nordic Cooperation (Iceland)
 Minister for Nordic Cooperation (Sweden)

References 

Lists of government ministers of Finland
Nordic politics